Coleotechnites martini is a moth of the family Gelechiidae. It is found in North America, where it has been recorded from Ontario and Maine.

The wingspan is 9–10 mm. The forewings are shining black with fawn coloured scales below the fold. The hindwings are black.

The larvae feed on Picea abies and Picea glauca. They mine the leaves of their host plant. The mine starts at the tip of the leaf. Second instar larvae enters the tip of another leaf and later enters yet another leaf, this time at the base. The larva overwinters beneath a frass-covered tent and continues feeding in spring.

References

Moths described in 1965
Coleotechnites